Wegonfunkwichamind is the second studio album by the American rapper Big Mello, from Houston, Texas. It was released in 1994 via Rap-A-Lot Records.

Track listing

Personnel
Curtis Donnell Davis – main artist, vocals, producer (tracks: 2-4, 6-7, 10-11, 13-14, 16-18), design & layout
Simon "Crazy C" Cullins – keyboards, vocoder, mixing, producer (tracks: 1, 5-6, 9-10, 12-18)
Michael George Dean – lead guitar, bass, Rhodes piano, synthesizer, producer (track 8), mastering
Corey Stoot – lead guitar, bass
Terrence 'Bearwolf' Williams – piano, synthesizer
Mark Gordon – horns
Vikta Black – backing vocals, drums (track 1)
Derwinn Parrish "Dirtt" – bass (tracks: 4, 13)
Preston Middleton – bass (track 16)
Roger Tausz – bass (tracks: 11-12, 18), mixing
'Maestro' John Hillard – horns, assistant engineering
Harvey Jerome Kelley – co-producer (track 17)
Troy "Pee Wee" Clark – co-producer (track 6)
James A. Smith – executive producer
James Hoover – mixing
Richard Simpson – engineering & mixing
Craig Gilmore – assistant engineering
Patrick Nixon – art direction
Derril Vallery – photography

Charts

References

External links

1994 albums
Big Mello albums
Rap-A-Lot Records albums
Albums produced by Mike Dean (record producer)